The UEFA Women's Champions League is a women's association football competition established in 2001. It is the only international competition for European women's football clubs. The competition is open to the league champions of all UEFA member associations who run such championships; 46 of UEFA's 53 member associations have entered. The top eight associations may enter two teams, and the title holder is also entitled to an additional spot if they do not qualify through their domestic league. The first final was held in a single match final. Between 2003 and 2009, the final was contested in two legs, one at each participating club's home, but the single match was reinstated in 2010. The competition was known as UEFA Women's Cup until 2009.

French side Lyon hold the record with eight titles. Umeå and VfL Wolfsburg hold the distinction of losing the final the most times with three final losses each. Germany is the most successful member association with nine titles.

List of finals

Performances

By teams

By nation

See also
List of European Cup and UEFA Champions League finals
List of UEFA Cup and Europa League finals
List of UEFA Cup Winners' Cup finals
List of UEFA Super Cup matches
List of UEFA Intertoto Cup winners

Notes

References

General

Specific

External links
UEFA Women's Cup official history

UEFA Women's Champions League
UEFA Women's Champions League
Women's sport-related lists